Blessings (Chinese: 祖先保佑) is a time-travelling drama series produced by MediaCorp Studios and aired on MediaCorp Channel 8. The show aired at 9pm on weekdays and had a repeat telecast at 8am the following day. The series stars Shaun Chen, Chen Hanwei, Yao Wenlong, Yvonne Lim, Jesseca Liu and Sora Ma as the main characters of the series. The series is producer Kwek Leng Soong's final drama series before she left MediaCorp in August 2015.  A sequel, Blessings 2 was produced and first aired on 1 October 2018.

Cast

Main Cast

Supporting Cast

Cameo/Special Appearance

Awards & Nominations

Star Awards 2015
Blessings is nominated for 9 awards in Star Awards 2015, it won 1 out of 9 awards. The other dramas nominated for Best Drama Series and/or Best Theme Song include Against The Tide, C.L.I.F. 3, The Journey: Tumultuous Times, Three Wishes and World At Your Feet.

See also
List of Blessings episodes
List of MediaCorp Channel 8 Chinese drama series (2010s)

References

Singapore Chinese dramas
2014 Singaporean television series debuts
2014 Singaporean television series endings
Television series set in 1948
Television series set in 2014
Singaporean time travel television series
Television series about families
Confectionery in fiction
Channel 8 (Singapore) original programming